Sofya Vasilyevna Kovalevskaya, born Korvin-Krukovskaya ( – 10 February 1891), was a Russian mathematician who made noteworthy contributions to analysis, partial differential equations and mechanics. She was a pioneer for women in mathematics around the world – the first woman to obtain a doctorate (in the modern sense) in mathematics, the first woman appointed to a full professorship in northern Europe and one of the first women to work for a scientific journal as an editor. According to historian of science Ann Hibner Koblitz, Kovalevskaya was "the greatest known woman scientist before the twentieth century".

Historian of mathematics Roger Cooke writes:

Her sister was the socialist Anne Jaclard.

There are several alternative transliterations of her name. She herself used Sophie Kowalevski (or occasionally Kowalevsky) in her academic publications.

Background and early education

Sofya Kovalevskaya (née Korvin-Krukovskaya) was born in Moscow, the second of three children. Her father, Lieutenant General Vasily Vasilyevich Korvin-Krukovsky, served in the Imperial Russian Army as head of the Moscow Artillery before retiring to Palibino, his family estate in Vitebsk Region in 1858, when Kovalevskaya was eight years old. He was a member of the minor nobility, of mixed (Bela)Russian–Polish descent (Polish on his father's side), with possible partial ancestry from the royal Corvin family of Hungary, and served as Marshall of Nobility for Vitebsk province. (There may also have been some Romani ancestry on the father's side.)

Her mother, Yelizaveta Fedorovna Shubert (Schubert), descended from a family of German immigrants to St. Petersburg who lived on Vasilievsky Island. Her maternal great-grandfather was the astronomer and geographer Friedrich Theodor Schubert (1758−1825), who emigrated to Russia from Germany around 1785. He became a full member of the St. Petersburg Academy of Science and head of its astronomical observatory. His son, Kovalevskaya's maternal grandfather, was General Theodor Friedrich von Schubert (1789−1865), who was head of the military topographic service, and an honorary member of the Russian Academy of Sciences, as well as Director of the Kunstkamera museum.

Kovalevskaya's parents provided her with a good early education.  At various times, her governesses were native speakers of English, French, and German. When she was 11 years old, she was intrigued by a foretaste of what she was to learn later in her lessons in calculus; the wall of her room had been papered with pages from lecture notes by Ostrogradsky, left over from her father's student days. She was tutored privately in elementary mathematics by Iosif Ignatevich Malevich.

The physicist Nikolai Nikanorovich Tyrtov noted her unusual aptitude when she managed to understand his textbook by discovering for herself an approximate construction of trigonometric functions which she had not yet encountered in her studies. Tyrtov called her a "new Pascal" and suggested she be given a chance to pursue further studies under the tutelage of N. Strannoliubskii. In 1866-67 she spent much of the winter with her family in St. Petersburg, where she was provided private tutoring by Strannoliubskii, a well-known advocate of higher education for women, who taught her calculus. During that same period, the son of a local priest introduced her sister Anna to progressive ideas influenced by the radical movement of the 1860s, providing her with copies of radical journals of the time discussing Russian nihilism.

Although the word nihilist (нигилист) often was used in a negative sense, it did not have that meaning for the young Russians of the 1860s (шестидесятники): 

Despite her obvious talent for mathematics, she could not complete her education in Russia. At that time, women were not allowed to attend universities in Russia and most other countries.  In order to study abroad, Kovalevskaya needed written permission from her father (or husband). Accordingly, in 1868 she contracted a "fictitious marriage" with Vladimir Kovalevskij, a young paleontology student, book publisher and radical, who was the first to translate and publish the works of Charles Darwin in Russia. They moved from Russia to Germany in 1869, after a brief stay in Vienna, in order to pursue advanced studies.

Student years

In April 1869, following Sofia's and Vladimir's brief stay in Vienna, where she attended lectures in physics at the university, they moved to Heidelberg. Through great efforts, she obtained 
permission to audit classes with the professors' approval at the University of Heidelberg.  There she attended courses in physics and mathematics under such teachers as Hermann von Helmholtz, Gustav Kirchhoff and Robert Bunsen.  Vladimir, meanwhile, went on to
the University of Jena to pursue a doctorate in paleontology.

In October 1869, shortly after attending courses in Heidelberg, she visited London with Vladimir, who spent time with his colleagues Thomas Huxley and Charles Darwin, while she was invited to attend George Eliot's Sunday salons. There, at age nineteen, she met Herbert Spencer and was led into a debate, at Eliot's instigation, on "woman's capacity for abstract thought".  Although there is no record of the details of their conversation, she had just completed a lecture course in Heidelberg on mechanics, and  she may just possibly have made mention of the Euler equations governing the motion of a rigid body (see following section).  George Eliot was writing Middlemarch at the time, in which one finds the remarkable sentence: "In short, woman was a problem which, since Mr. Brooke's mind felt blank before it, could hardly be less complicated than the revolutions of an irregular solid."   This was well before she made her notable contribution of the "Kovalevskaya top" to the brief list of known examples of integrable rigid body motion (see following section).

In October 1870, Kovalevskaya moved to Berlin, where she began to take private lessons with Karl Weierstrass, since the university would not allow her even to audit classes. He was very impressed
with her mathematical skills, and over the subsequent three years taught her the same material that comprised his lectures at the university.

In 1871 she briefly traveled to Paris together with Vladimir in order to help in the Paris Commune, where Kovalevskaya attended the injured and her sister Anyuta was active in the Commune. With the fall of the Commune, however, both Anyuta and her common law husband Victor Jaclard, who was leader of the Montmartre contingent of the National Guard and a prominent Blanquiste, were arrested. Although Anyuta managed to escape to London, Jaclard was sentenced to execution. However, with the assistance of Sofia's and Anyuta's father General Krukovsky, who had come urgently to Paris to help Anyuta and who wrote to Adolphe Thiers asking for clemency, they managed to save Victor Jaclard.

Kovalevskaya returned to Berlin and continued her studies with Weierstrass for three more years. In 1874 she presented three papers—on partial differential equations, on the dynamics of Saturn's rings, and on elliptic integrals—to the University of Göttingen as her doctoral dissertation. With the support of Weierstrass, this earned her a doctorate in mathematics summa cum laude, after Weierstrass succeeded in having her exempted from the usual oral examinations.

Kovalevskaya thereby became the first woman to have been awarded a doctorate (in the modern sense of the word) in mathematics. Her paper on partial differential equations contains what is now commonly known as the Cauchy–Kovalevskaya theorem, which proves the existence and analyticity
of local solutions to such equations under suitably defined initial/boundary conditions.

Last years in Germany and Sweden

In 1874, Kovalevskaya and her husband Vladimir returned to Russia, but Vladimir failed to secure a professorship because of his radical beliefs. (Kovalevskaya never would have been considered for such a position because of her sex.)  During this time they tried a variety of schemes to support themselves, including real estate development and involvement with an oil company.  But in the late 1870s they developed financial problems, leading to bankruptcy.

In 1875, for some unknown reason, perhaps the death of her father, Sofia and Vladimir decided to spend several years together as an actual married couple. Three years later their daughter, Sofia (called "Fufa"), was born. After almost two years devoted to raising her daughter, Kovalevskaya put Fufa under the care of relatives and friends, resumed her work in mathematics, and left Vladimir for what would be the last time.

Vladimir, who had always suffered severe mood swings, became more unstable. In 1883, faced with worsening mood swings and the possibility of being prosecuted for his role in a stock swindle, Vladimir committed suicide.

That year, with the help of the mathematician Gösta Mittag-Leffler, whom she had known as a fellow student of Weierstrass, Kovalevskaya was able to secure a position as a privat-docent at Stockholm University in Sweden. Kovalevskaya met Mittag-Leffler's sister, the actress, novelist, and playwright Anne Charlotte Edgren-Leffler. Until Kovalevskaya's death the two women shared a close friendship.

In 1884 Kovalevskaya was appointed to a five-year position as Extraordinary Professor (assistant professor in modern terminology) and became an editor of Acta Mathematica. In 1888 she won the Prix Bordin of the French Academy of Science, for her work "Mémoire sur un cas particulier du problème de la rotation d'un corps pesant autour d'un point fixe, où l'intégration s'effectue à l'aide des fonctions ultraelliptiques du temps". Her submission featured the celebrated discovery of what is now known as the "Kovalevskaya top", which was subsequently shown to be the only other case of rigid body motion that is "completely integrable" other than the tops of Euler and Lagrange.

In 1889 Kovalevskaya was appointed Ordinary Professor (full professor) at Stockholm University, the first woman in Europe in modern times to hold such a position. After much lobbying on her behalf (and a change in the Academy's rules) she was made a Corresponding Member of the Russian Academy of Sciences, but she was never offered a professorship in Russia.

Kovalevskaya, who was involved in the progressive political and feminist currents of late nineteenth-century Russian nihilism, wrote several non-mathematical works as well, including a memoir, A Russian Childhood, two plays (in collaboration with Duchess Anne Charlotte Edgren-Leffler) and a partly autobiographical novel, Nihilist Girl (1890).

In 1889, Kovalevskaya fell in love with Maxim Kovalevsky, a distant relation of her deceased husband, but insisted on not marrying him because she would not be able to settle down and live with him.

Kovalevskaya died of epidemic influenza complicated by pneumonia in 1891 at age forty-one, after returning from a vacation in Nice with Maxim. She is buried in Solna, Sweden, at Norra begravningsplatsen.

Kovalevskaya's mathematical results, such as the Cauchy–Kowalevski theorem, and her pioneering role as a female mathematician in an almost exclusively male-dominated field, have made her the subject of several books, including a biography by Ann Hibner Koblitz, a biography in Russian by Polubarinova-Kochina (translated into English by M. Burov with the title Love and Mathematics: Sofya Kovalevskaya, Mir Publishers, 1985), and a book about her mathematics by R. Cooke.

Tributes
Sonya Kovalevsky High School Mathematics Day is a grant-making program of the Association for Women in Mathematics (AWM), funding workshops across the United States which encourage girls to explore mathematics. While the AWM currently does not have grant money to support this program, multiple universities continue the program with their own funding.

The Sonya Kovalevsky Lecture is sponsored annually by the AWM and the Society for Industrial and Applied Mathematics, and is intended to highlight significant contributions of women in the fields of applied or computational mathematics.

The Kovalevskaia Fund, founded in 1985 with the purpose of supporting women in science in developing countries, was named in her honor.

The lunar crater Kovalevskaya is named in her honor.

A gymnasium (high school) and progymnasium in Vilnius and gymnasium in Velikiye Luki are named after Sofya Kovalevskaya.

The Alexander Von Humboldt Foundation of Germany bestows a bi-annual Sofia Kovalevskaya Award to promising young researchers.

Saint Petersburg, Moscow, and Stockholm have streets named in honor of Kovalevskaya.

On 30 June 2021, a satellite named after her (ÑuSat 22 or "Sofya", COSPAR 2021-059AS) was launched into space as part of the Satellogic Aleph-1 constellation.

In film
Kovalevskaya has been the subject of three film and TV biographies.

 Sofya Kovalevskaya (1956) directed by Iosef Shapiro, starring Yelena Yunger, Lev Kolesov and Tatyana Sezenyevskaya.
 Berget på månens baksida ("A Hill on the Dark Side of the Moon") (1983) directed by Lennart Hjulström, starring Gunilla Nyroos as Sofja Kovalewsky and Bibi Andersson as Anne Charlotte Edgren-Leffler, Duchess of Cajanello, and sister to Gösta Mittag-Leffler.
 Sofya Kovalevskaya (1985 TV) directed by Azerbaijani director Ayan Shakhmaliyeva, starring Yelena Safonova as Sofia.

In fiction
 Little Sparrow: A Portrait of Sophia Kovalevsky (1983), Don H. Kennedy, Ohio University Press, Athens, Ohio
 Beyond the Limit: The Dream of Sofya Kovalevskaya (2002), a biographical novel by mathematician and educator Joan Spicci, published by Tom Doherty Associates, LLC, is an historically accurate portrayal of her early married years and quest for an education. It is based in part on 88 of Kovalevskaya's letters, which the author translated from Russian to English.
 Against the Day, a 2006 novel by Thomas Pynchon was speculated before release to be based on the life of Kovalevskaya, but in the finished novel she appears as a minor character.
 "Too Much Happiness" (2009), short story by Alice Munro, published in the August 2009 issue of Harper's Magazine features Kovalevskaya as a main character. It was later published in a collection of the same name.

See also
Cauchy–Kowalevski theorem
Kowalevski top
Timeline of women in science
Timeline of women in mathematics

Selected publications

 (The surname given in the paper is "von Kowalevsky".)

Novel
 Nihilist Girl, translated by Natasha Kolchevska with Mary Zirin; introduction by Natasha Kolchevska. Modern Language Association of America (2001)

References

Further reading

 Cooke, Roger (1984).The Mathematics of Sonya Kovalevskaya (Springer-Verlag) 
 Kennedy, Don H. (1983). Little Sparrow, a Portrait of Sofia Kovalevsky. Athens: Ohio University Press. 
 Koblitz, Ann Hibner (1993). A Convergence of Lives: Sofia Kovalevskaia -- Scientist, Writer, Revolutionary. Lives of women in science, 99-2518221-2 (2., revised ed.). New Brunswick, N.J.: Rutgers Univ. P. 
 Koblitz, Ann Hibner (1987). Sofia Vasilevna Kovalevskaia in 
 The Legacy of Sonya Kovalevskaya: proceedings of a symposium sponsored by the Association for Women in Mathematics and the Mary Ingraham Bunting Institute, held October 25–28, 1985. Contemporary mathematics, 0271-4132 ; 64. Providence, R.I.: American Mathematical Society. 1987.

External links

 "Sofia Kovalevskaya", Biographies of Women Mathematicians, Agnes Scott College
 
 Women's History - Sofia Kovalevskaya
 Brief biography of Sofia Kovalevskaya by Yuriy Belits. University of Colorado at Denver, March 17, 2005.
 Biography (in Russian)
 Association for Women in Mathematics
 
 Sof'i Kovalevskoy street, Saint Petersburg (OpenStreetMap)
 Sof'i Kovalevskoy street, Moscow (OpenStreetMap)

19th-century mathematicians from the Russian Empire
Corresponding members of the Saint Petersburg Academy of Sciences
Writers from Moscow
Russian mathematicians
Heidelberg University alumni
Women mathematicians
Women writers from the Russian Empire
1850 births
1891 deaths
Deaths from pneumonia in Sweden
19th-century women from the Russian Empire
Emigrants from the Russian Empire to Sweden
Woman scientists from the Russian Empire
Russian nihilists
Russian women novelists
19th-century women scientists
19th-century novelists from the Russian Empire
19th-century women writers from the Russian Empire
19th-century writers from the Russian Empire
Burials at Norra begravningsplatsen